Morrison Street may refer to:
 Morrison Street, Hong Kong, a street in Sheung Wan, Hong Kong
 Morrison Road, in Perth, Western Australia
 Wangfujing, in Beijing, formerly named Morrison Street